Tomáš Škvaridlo (born June 19, 1981) is a Slovak professional ice hockey player currently playing for HKm Zvolen in the Slovak Extraliga. He was drafted 144th overall by the Pittsburgh Penguins in the 1999 NHL Entry Draft.

Career statistics

References

External links

1981 births
Living people
HC '05 Banská Bystrica players
HKM Zvolen players
Kingston Frontenacs players
Pittsburgh Penguins draft picks
Rapaces de Gap players
Slovak ice hockey left wingers
MsHK Žilina players
Sportspeople from Zvolen
Slovak expatriate ice hockey players in Canada
Slovak expatriate ice hockey players in the Czech Republic
Expatriate ice hockey players in France
Slovak expatriate sportspeople in France